Marcignago is a comune (municipality) in the Province of Pavia in the Italian region Lombardy, located about 25 km southwest of Milan and about 9 km northwest of Pavia. As of 31 December 2004, it had a population of 2,155 and an area of 10.1 km2.

Marcignago borders the following municipalities: Battuda, Certosa di Pavia, Pavia, Torre d'Isola, Trivolzio, Vellezzo Bellini.

Demographic evolution

References

Cities and towns in Lombardy